Pyrgocorypha uncinata, the hook-faced conehead, is a species of conehead in the family Tettigoniidae. It is found in North America.

References

Conocephalinae
Articles created by Qbugbot
Insects described in 1841